The Past Presents the Future is an album by Her Space Holiday. It was released September 27, 2005 on Wichita Recordings.

Track listing
 "Forever and a Day" - 3:49
 "Missed Medicine" - 3:46
 "The Weight of the World" - 5:00
 "Self Helpless" - 3:55
 "You and Me" - 4:36
 "A Small Setback to a Great Comeback" - 2:26
 "The Good People of Everywhere" - 4:45 
 "A Match Made in Texas" - 4:02
 "The Great Parade" - 4:49
 "The Past Presents the Future" - 4:19

References 

2005 albums
Her Space Holiday albums
Wichita Recordings albums